Tigerair Australia (known as Tiger Airways Australia until July 2013) was a low-cost airline based in Melbourne, Australia. At the time of its cessation in March 2020, it flew to seven destinations in Australia. A second base was opened in Sydney in 2012, followed by Brisbane as a third base in 2014.

It operated short-haul international services to Denpasar, Indonesia for a limited time. Services ended in early 2017.

Destinations
Tigerair served seven destinations as of March 2020:

References

External links

Tigerair Australia Main Site

Lists of airline destinations